All Saints Church at Dodington in the parish of Holford, Somerset, England was rebuilt and enlarged in the 15th century. It has been designated by English Heritage as a Grade I listed building.

The nave was refenestrated and re-roofed in the 16th century, and the chancel refenestrated early in the 17th century, having been previously rebuilt in the 15th century. A chapel was added in 1610, and the upper stage of the tower added in 1772. New pews were added in 1874 and further restoration, including the building of the lych gate took place after World War I. The tower had four bells in 1933 but they are no longer rung.

In the church is a memorial to Admiral Sir Edward Codrington.

See also
 List of Grade I listed buildings in West Somerset
 List of towers in Somerset

References

15th-century church buildings in England
Church of England church buildings in West Somerset
Grade I listed churches in Somerset
Grade I listed buildings in West Somerset